Bleed Out may refer to:

 Bleed Out (film), 2018 documentary film
 Bleed Out (album), 2022 studio album by the Mountain Goats
 Bleed Out, 2011 film by Dutch Marich
 "Bleed Out", 2013 episode of Southland
 "Bleed Out", 2013 song by Blue October from Sway
 "Bleed Out", 2015 song by Scott Weiland and the Wildabouts from Blaster
 "Bleed Out", 2018 episode of Wentworth

See also
 Exsanguination, death caused by loss of blood